A list of crime films released in the 1960s.

Notes

References

 

Crime films
 *
1960s